Kalyanaraman or Kalyana Raman may refer to:
Kalyanaraman (1979 film), a Tamil film starring Kamal Haasan
Kalyanaraman (2002 film), a Malayalam film starring Dileep, Navyanair
S. Kalyanaraman (1930-1994), a Carnatic classical musician
Japanil Kalyanaraman, 1985 Tamil film starring Kamal Haasan